The fifth and final season of Samurai Jack, an American animated series, premiered on Adult Swim's Toonami programming block on March 11, 2017, and concluded its run on May 20, 2017. The announcement of the season came in December 2015, eleven years since the series was originally concluded on Cartoon Network. Genndy Tartakovsky, the series' creator, returned as a director, writer, and storyboarder for this season. The season received universal acclaim from both critics and fans, praising it for its visuals as well as its more dark, intense, and mature tone.

Plot 

The fifth season of the series takes place fifty years after the original four seasons, although Jack himself has stopped aging as a side effect of time travel. Aku has destroyed all existing time portals but is distressed over the prospect of battling Jack forever, so he has stopped pursuing him directly. Jack's heroic actions have inspired many to oppose Aku's tyranny, among them the now-elderly Scotsman, who unsuccessfully leads armies in a battle against Aku and is killed by him but returns as the spirit of his younger self. Unknown to Aku, Jack has lost his sword, and is troubled by hallucinations of his deceased family, his former self, and Aku's numerous victims, almost to the point of suicide. 

A set of fraternal septuplet girls are born from Aku's essence to the high priestess of a cult of female Aku worshipers, the "Daughters of Aku", and raised as assassins with the sole purpose of killing Jack. They find and overwhelm Jack, but he later kills all but one of them, Ashi, the eldest. In the bowels of a monster that swallows them both, Jack saves her from various dangers, attempting to convince her of Aku's evil. Deciding to accompany Jack, Ashi comes to see the truth of Jack's words, and helps him through his emotional and spiritual journey, preventing a suicide attempt and helping him reclaim his sword. Following a battle alongside each other, they become romantically involved. 

Aku eventually learns that Jack lost his sword and confronts him, not knowing Jack has recovered it in the interim. However, Aku senses his essence within Ashi, and seizes control of her in order to attack Jack. Jack refuses to kill Ashi and lays down his sword in defeat. Aku takes Jack prisoner and prepares to kill him, but everyone Jack has helped throughout his journey rallies to his defense. Jack admits to Ashi he loves her, enabling her to regain control of herself. She returns the sword to Jack and uses demonic powers she inherited from Aku to time travel with Jack to the moment when Aku sent Jack to the future, whereupon Jack destroys the weakened Aku for good. With peace restored, Ashi and Jack prepare to marry, but on her way to the altar, she suddenly collapses, as slaying Aku invalidates her existence, causing her to fade away. 

The series ends with a grieving Jack smiling when he watches a ladybug land on his hand and then fly free in a grove of blossoming sakura trees.

Development

Background 
Created by Genndy Tartakovsky, Samurai Jack originally aired on Cartoon Network from 2001 to 2004, comprising four seasons. The series follows a young samurai (voiced by Phil LaMarr) who is cast into the future by the evil shape-shifting demon Aku (voiced originally by Mako, Greg Baldwin (fifth season)) mere moments before defeating the demon. He adopts the name Jack and continues his fight in the dystopian future ruled by Aku. Jack seeks to find a portal back to his time but is constantly thwarted by the demon's forces. The series was left open-ended after the conclusion of the fourth season. Tartakovsky previously expressed interest in a film adaptation of the series to provide a genuine conclusion, but the project never materialized.

Production 

Starting in 2014, reruns of Samurai Jack were aired on Toonami, an action-oriented programming block on Adult Swim. Within two weeks of Tartakovsky's first communication with executive Mike Lazzo, a deal was reached for 10 more episodes of the series. The network released a short teaser in December 2015 after it green-lit the return of the series with Genndy Tartakovsky as executive producer and Cartoon Network Studios as the season's production company. Artwork used in the teaser derived from the cover of an issue from IDW Publishing's comic book adaptation of the series. The new season received further mention ahead of the network's 2016 upfront press release. The fifth season was announced for the 2016–17 television season. Work-in-progress excerpts were shared at the 2016 Annecy International Animated Film Festival. According to Tartakovsky, having a small production team allowed for a smaller budget, faster schedule, and greater creative freedom for the team, and executive producer Mike Lazzo gave the team a free hand, with minimal intervention in the production. Changes in television animation storytelling since the cartoon's original series allowed the show to shift from episodic storytelling, where each episode is more or less independent from the others, to one cohesive serialized story that will conclude Jack's journey. The serialized format allows every episode to have a "reveal" that takes the show in a different direction. The final episode was storyboarded on October 2016, and Tartakovsky expressed hope it would have a very emotional impact on the audience. All the original Samurai Jack episodes are designated by Roman numerals, and the original series ended with episode "LII" (52). Season five opens with episode "XCII" (92); the jump in numbering signifies the elapsed time from the last episode of season four.

Casting 
Phil LaMarr reprises his role as Jack, and John DiMaggio reprises his role as the Scotsman, a fan-favorite ally of Jack's. Sab Shimono reprises his role as the Emperor, Jack's unnamed father who originally vanquished Aku. Due to the death of Mako, who originally voiced Aku, Tartakovsky at first considered using a completely different voice for the character. However, considering how Mako's voice was an important element of the character, voice actor Greg Baldwin was brought in to mimic the original voice. Baldwin had previously served as Mako's replacement as the voice of Iroh during the final season of Avatar: The Last Airbender and the second and third seasons of The Legend of Korra. Tara Strong and Tom Kenny, who guest starred in the previous seasons, respectively voice the season's recurring characters Ashi and Scaramouche.

Themes 
The season explores the hero's journey and the identity of the hero when his journey stagnates. Choice and lack of choice are explored: in Jack's introspections and actions; in the actions of Jack's enemies; in the contrast between humans who choose their actions and machines which are programmed; and in destiny and fate which offer no choice. Of the distinction and parallel between robots and humans, Tartakovsky said: "I wanted to show the human side that's been treated like a machine. Aku builds robots and all these robots are singularly programmed to kill Jack. What if it's humans? What if the one purpose in your whole life is to kill this one person and you're raised from birth that way?" Angelica Jade Bastién of New York magazine writes that there is a "distinctive undercurrent of loneliness stretching through the series from start to finish." Jack is often alone, dwarfed by the "grand solemnity of nature." He has lost his home and his relationship with his family, and in the final episode he loses his relationship with the woman he is about to marry.

Cast 

 Phil LaMarr – Samurai Jack, Host, Frog, Mad Jack, additional voices
 Greg Baldwin – Aku, additional voices
 Tara Strong – Ashi, Avi, Vision, additional voices
 Grey Griffin – High Priestess, Flora, Olivia
 Sab Shimono – The Emperor
 Lauren Tom – Mother
 Tom Kenny – Scaramouche, Chritchellite
 Kari Wahlgren – Ami, Aki, additional voices
 Chris Parnell – Mud Alien, Scientist
 Keone Young – Bandit, Monk
 Corey Burton – Crow
 John DiMaggio – Scotsman
 Aaron LaPlante – Dominator, The Omen
 Kevin Michael Richardson – Woolie #1, Demongo
 Keegan-Michael Key – Da' Samurai
 Daran Norris – additional voices
 Billy West – additional voices
 Rob Paulsen – Sir Rothchild (credited as a Dog) 
 Jeff Glen Bennett – additional voices
 Mako – Past Aku (via archived recording)

Episodes

Broadcast 
On January 24, 2017, Adult Swim announced in an interstitial bumper that the show would debut on March 11, 2017. The first three episodes of the season were screened at the Ace Hotel Los Angeles two days before the season's television premiere. An unannounced change in schedule on April Fools' Day supplanted a new Samurai Jack episode with the premiere of the third season of Rick and Morty, which aired repeatedly from 8 PM to midnight ET.

Home media 
This season is available in HD and SD for digital purchase on iTunes, Google Play, Amazon Video, Microsoft Store, and PlayStation Store.

Full season release 
The full season set was released on DVD and Blu-ray on October 17, 2017. In Australia it was released by Madman Entertainment

Reception 
On review aggregator website Rotten Tomatoes, the season holds an approval rating of 100% based on 23 reviews, with an average rating of 9.08/10, with the critics' consensus reading: "An increasing intensity and maturity are evident in Samurai Jacks beautifully animated, action-packed and overall compelling fifth season". On Metacritic the season has an average score of 94 out of 100, based on 6 critics, indicating "universal acclaim". Joshua Yehl of IGN called it a "double-edged season" referring to the contrast between the presentation and the story. He calls the presentation, artistry, animation and sound design masterful, in contrast to the story that didn't always deliver satisfying answers to the questions introduced early in the season, despite being more mature and sophisticated than the original show.

References 

2017 American television seasons
5
Matricide in fiction
Time travel in television